A Vacation in Hell is a 1979 American made-for-television, action-adventure-thriller film starring Priscilla Barnes, Barbara Feldon, Maureen McCormick, Andrea Marcovicci, and Michael Brandon as part of a group of lost vacationers being stalked through the Hawaiian jungle.  It was helmed by Roots director David Greene and has acquired a cult following, due in large part to subsequent reairings in syndication.

Cast
Priscilla Barnes  ...  Denise
Barbara Feldon  ...  Evelyn
Andrea Marcovicci  ...  Barbara
Maureen McCormick  ...  Margret
Michael Brandon  ...  Alan
Ed Ka'ahea  ...  the Hunter

References

External links
 

1979 television films
1979 films
1970s action thriller films
1970s adventure films
ABC network original films
American action adventure films
American adventure thriller films
American action thriller films
Films shot in Hawaii
1970s chase films
Films directed by David Greene
Films scored by Gil Mellé
1970s English-language films
1970s American films